Renan Pereira Muniz Oliveira (born 26 May 2001), commonly known as Renan or Renanzinho, is a Brazilian footballer who currently plays as a forward for Manaus, on loan from Guarani.

Career statistics

Club

Notes

References

2001 births
Living people
Brazilian footballers
Association football forwards
Guarani FC players
Campeonato Brasileiro Série B players
Sportspeople from Pernambuco